Rob Cook (born December 30, 1965) is a Republican member of the Montana Legislature.  He was elected to House District 27 which represents the Conrad area.

References

Living people
1965 births
Republican Party members of the Montana House of Representatives
Montana State University alumni
People from Conrad, Montana
People from Choteau, Montana